Smithson or Smythson is an English surname and (less often) a given name.

Notable people bearing the name include:

Architects
Alison and Peter Smithson, 20th-century British architects
Robert Smythson, 16th-century English architect, father of architect John Smythson, and grandfather of architect Huntingdon Smithson

Artists and entertainers
Annie M. P. Smithson, novelist
Robert Smithson, American artist
Carly Smithson, singer
Florence Smithson, singer and actor
Harriet Smithson, also known as Henrietta Constance Smithson, actor and wife of Hector Berlioz
Henry Smithson, the musician Riton

Politicians
Hugh Smithson, (1714–86) later Hugh Percy, 1st Duke of Northumberland
the Smithson baronets
Smithson E. Wright, 16th mayor of Columbus, Ohio

Scientists
James Smithson, British scientist, eponym of the Smithsonian Institution
Smithson Tennant, chemist

Sportspeople
Bryan Smithson, American basketball player
Fish Smithson, former NFL player
Forrest Smithson, American athlete
Gerald Smithson, English cricketer
Jerred Smithson, former NHL player
Moondog Spike, wrestler born Bill Smithson
Rodney Smithson, footballer who played for Oxford United

Others
Alan Smithson, Bishop of Jarrow
John Smithson (university president), American college administrator
John Smithson, producer at the Discovery Channel
Mike Smithson (disambiguation), several people

Fiction
Andrea Smithson Darling, a character on Dirty Sexy Money
Charles Smithson, a major character in The French Lieutenant's Woman
"Smithson", a webcomic by Shaenon K. Garrity

In other languages
 Ben-Hadad (Syriac)
 Kovachevich, Kovačević, Kovalevich (Slavic)

See also
Smithson (crater)
Smithson Glacier
Smithson, Indiana
Smythson, a British company
Smithson Valley High School
Smithson–McCall Farm
Smithson and McKay Brothers Blocks
Mount Smithson, one of the Prince Olav Mountains

References

English-language surnames